Mykhailo Serbin (born 5 October 2003) is a Ukrainian Paralympic swimmer. He represented Ukraine at the 2020 Summer Paralympics.

Career
Serbin made his international debut for Ukraine at the 2018 World Para Swimming European Championships where he won a bronze medal in the men's 400 metres freestyle S11 event.

Serbin represented Ukraine in the men's 100 metre backstroke S11 event at the 2020 Summer Paralympics and won a gold medal.

References

2003 births
Living people
Ukrainian male freestyle swimmers
Sportspeople from Kharkiv
Paralympic swimmers of Ukraine
Medalists at the World Para Swimming Championships
Medalists at the World Para Swimming European Championships
Swimmers at the 2020 Summer Paralympics
Medalists at the 2020 Summer Paralympics
Paralympic gold medalists for Ukraine
Paralympic silver medalists for Ukraine
Paralympic medalists in swimming
Ukrainian male backstroke swimmers
Ukrainian male medley swimmers
S11-classified Paralympic swimmers
21st-century Ukrainian people